Nils Langer was the defending champion, but he chose not to compete this year.Simone Vagnozzi won the final 2–6, 6–3, 7–5 against Ivo Minář.

Seeds

Draw

Finals

Top half

Bottom half

References
 Main Draw

Marburg Open - Singles
2010 Singles